The Weston Centre is a 32-story modern-styled skyscraper in Downtown San Antonio, Texas, USA. Standing at a structural height of 444 feet (135 m), it is the third tallest skyscraper in San Antonio and the city's tallest office building.

History 
The building was originally called NBC Bank Plaza, and is faced with precast concrete containing Texas granite and limestone. The city's riverwalk passes directly to the east of the building. The building and adjacent garages were completed at a cost of $80.9 million, at the time the most expensive commercial project San Antonio had ever seen.

In popular culture
Film
 The 1991 film Knight Rider 2000 shows the exterior of the building in a few shots and scenes were filmed inside the lobby.

Television
 That '70s show season seven episode eight (titled "Angie") shows the Weston Centre and Downtown San Antonio out of a window despite the scene being set in Wisconsin.

References

External links

Weston Centre – San Antonio's Centerpiece

Office buildings completed in 1988
Skyscraper office buildings in San Antonio